
Year 627 (DCXXVII) was a common year starting on Thursday of the Julian calendar. The denomination 627 for this year has been used since the early medieval period, when the Anno Domini calendar era became the prevalent method in Europe for naming years.

Events 
 By place 

 Byzantine Empire 
 Spring – Byzantine–Sasanian War: Emperor Heraclius sweeps through southern Armenia with a 50,000-man expeditionary force, recapturing most of the Byzantine fortresses lost to the Persians ten and fifteen years earlier. The army of Shahrbaraz, still in Anatolia, is now cut off completely. Hearing from Byzantine agents (showing him letters) that King Khosrau II, dissatisfied with his failure to capture Constantinople, is planning to have him executed, he surrenders to Heraclius, refusing to join the Byzantine army against his ungrateful sovereign.
 Third Perso-Turkic War: The Göktürks and their Khazar allies (40,000 men) approach the Caspian Gates, and capture the Persian fortress at Derbent (modern Dagestan). Heraclius marches to the upper Tigris and invades the Persian heartland, leaving the Khazars under Tong Yabghu Qaghan to continue the siege of Tblilisi.
 December 12 – Battle of Nineveh: Heraclius crosses the Great Zab river and, in a feigned retreat, defeats the Persian army (12,000 men) under Rhahzadh, near the ruins of Nineveh (Iraq). Although wounded, Heraclius refuses to leave the battlefield, and in a final cavalry charge personally kills the Persian general.
 Winter – Heraclius plunders the city palace of Dastgerd (Iran) and gains tremendous riches (also recovering 300 captured Byzantine flags). He turns northeastward to Caucasian Albania to rest his army. Khosrau II flees to the mountains of Susiana, to rally support for the defense of the Persian capital Ctesiphon.Norwich, John Julius (1997), A Short History of Byzantium, Vintage Books, p. 93. 

 Britain 
 King Eorpwald of East Anglia is murdered, and succeeded by Ricberht. He is a member of the East Anglian elite; during his rule paganism is re-established.
 April 12 – King Edwin of Northumbria is converted to Christianity by Bishop Paulinus of York, who previously saved his life.

 Arabia 
 March 31 – Battle of the Trench: Muhammad successfully withstands a siege for 27 days at Medina, by Meccan forces (10,000 men) under Abu Sufyan, whose allies, the Jewish tribe of Banu Qurayza, ultimately surrender to Muhammad.

 By topic 

 Religion 
 April 12 – Paulinus, last of the missionaries sent by Pope Gregory I, builds a wooden church in the old Roman legionary headquarters in York, and baptises Edwin of Northumbria as the first Christian king in northern England.
 Fourth Council of Mâcon: A council of Christian bishops approves the Monastic Rule of Saint Columbanus in the city of Mâcon (Burgundy).
 Cunibert is elected bishop of Cologne. Throughout his episcopacy, monasticism flourishes in Austrasia (approximate date).

 Education 
 St Peter's School, York, is founded by Paulinus.

Births 
 Cui Zhiwen, Tang Dynasty official (d. 683)

Deaths 
 Amatus, Benedictine abbot and hermit
 Bonus, Byzantine general and regent
 Cathal mac Áedo, king of Cashel (Ireland)
 King Eorpwald of East Anglia (approximate date)
 Feng Deyi, chancellor of the Tang dynasty (b. 568)
 Luo Yi, official of the Sui dynasty
 Pei Ju, official of the Tang dynasty
 Rhahzadh, Persian general
 Sichilde, Frankish queen
 King Stephen I of Iberia (Georgia)
 Zaynab bint Khuzayma, wife of Muhammad (b. 595)

References

Sources